Lolesara is a village in Bemetara in Bemetara district of Chhattisgarh State, India. The village is administrated by Sarpanch an elected representative of the village.

Demography 
, The village has a total number of 382 houses and the population of 2004 of which include 1000 are males while 1004 are females.  According to the report published by Census India in 2011, out of the total population of the village 326 people are from Schedule Caste and the village does not have any Schedule Tribe population so far.

See also
List of villages in India

References 

Villages in Durg district